Cox Creek Township is a township in Clayton County, Iowa, USA.  As of the 2000 census, its population was 348.

History
Cox Creek Township is named for Phillip Cox, who settled there in 1842.

Geography
According to the USGS, it contains ten cemeteries: Cords, Dohrer, Hartmann, Mederville, Meyer, Osborne, Sacred Heart, Schmidt, Union and Watkins.

The stream of Cox Creek runs through this township.

Notes

References
 USGS Geographic Names Information System (GNIS)

External links
 US-Counties.com
 City-Data.com

Townships in Clayton County, Iowa
Townships in Iowa